The Florida State University College of Social Sciences and Public Policy, located in Tallahassee, Florida, is one of fifteen colleges comprising Florida State University (FSU). The college was founded in 1973 and includes six departments: Economics, Geography, Political Science, Sociology, Urban and Regional Planning and the Askew School of Public Administration and Policy and interdisciplinary programs in African American Studies, Demography, International Studies, Interdisciplinary Social Science, and Public Health.

The college also contains the following centers and institutes: Center for Demography and Population Health (population research and training), Center for Disaster Risk Policy (technical assistance and system development related to emergency management), Claude Pepper Center (research and advocacy for public policy reform on issues related to senior citizens), DeVoe L. Moore Center for the Study of Critical Issues in Economic Policy and Government (studying the effect of government rules, regulations, and programs on individuals and the economy), Geographical Information Systems Laboratory (training for professional planners and geographers), L. Charles Hilton Jr. Center for the Study of Economic Prosperity and Individual Opportunity (research on how legal, social, and political institutions influence economy), LeRoy Collins Institute (independent, nonpartisan statewide policy organization to study private and public issues facing Florida and the nation), Pepper Institute on Aging and Public Policy (coordinator and facilitator for multidisciplinary work in aging studies; sponsors the Osher Lifelong Learning Institute, which encourages elders to return to campus to continue to learn), Stavros Center for Economic Education (promotes economics education in public schools through workshops and seminars, product development, and teacher training), Survey Research Laboratory (questionnaire and sample design, data collection, data entry and coding, data analysis for researchers, public agencies, and private organizations), William H. Kerr Intercultural Education and Dialogue Initiative (dedicated to "expanding educational opportunities for underprivileged youth around the world and creating international dialogue").

The college is home to 150 faculty members.

All departments offer professional master's degrees. Ph.D. degrees are offered in Economics, Geography, Political Science, Public Administration and Policy, Sociology, and Urban and Regional Planning. Many programs have achieved national acclaim and consistently rank in the top tiers among public universities. Among them are Urban and Regional Planning, Political Science, Urban Economics, Health and Aging, Gender Studies and the Askew School of Public Administration and Policy. The departments of Economics and Political Science have formed the Experimental Social Science Research Group (XS/FS), one of the nation's premier programs in experimental methods.

In the 2018-2019 academic year, the college's enrollment was 4,684, with 4,064 undergraduates and 620 graduate students, making it the third-largest college in the university. In the 2017-2018 academic year, 1,812 degrees were conferred: 1,526 bachelor's degrees, 264 master's, and 22 doctoral.

References

 
Educational institutions established in 1973
1973 establishments in Florida